Juniadaha Union is a union parishad situated at Bheramara Upazila,  in Kushtia District, Khulna Division of Bangladesh. There are 15 villages and 19 mouzas in the union.

References

External links
 

Unions of Khulna Division
Unions of Bheramara Upazila
Unions of Kushtia District